The Dungeon of King Lout is a 1982 fantasy role-playing game adventure published by Infinity Limited.

Contents
The Dungeon of King Lout is an adventure that consists of an underground trek to recover an elven princess from the evil King Lout and his minions.

Reception
J. David George reviewed The Dungeon of King Lout in The Space Gamer No. 53. George commented that "As good as just about anything else on the market, The Dungeon of King Lout is fine if the GM doesn't mind fleshing out details and statistics.  As is, though, most GMs could do as well on their own without much more effort.  At [the price], it's not worth it."

Reviews
Different Worlds #22 (July, 1982)

References

Fantasy role-playing game adventures
Role-playing game supplements introduced in 1982